Pierre-Andre Adam (born 1978) is a Seychellois swimmer. He competed in the 50 m and 100 m breaststroke events at the 2013 World Aquatics Championships.

References

Living people
1978 births
Seychellois male swimmers
Place of birth missing (living people)
Date of birth missing (living people)